Thes is a genus of beetles in the family Latridiidae, containing the following species:

 Thes bergrothi (Reitter, 1881)
 Thes laeviventris (Fall, 1899)

References

Latridiidae genera